2022 Michigan Proposal 3, the Right to Reproductive Freedom Initiative, also known as Reproductive Freedom for All, was a citizen-initiated proposed constitutional amendment in the state of Michigan, which was voted on as part of the 2022 Michigan elections. The amendment, which passed, codified reproductive rights, including access to abortion, in the Constitution of Michigan.

Background

Following the Dobbs v. Jackson Women's Health Organization ruling which overturned Roe v. Wade, access to abortion in Michigan became regulated by a 1931 law which criminalized abortion except in cases where the mother's life was at risk. The law was ruled unconstitutional by Michigan Court of Claims Judge Elizabeth L. Gleicher, characterizing the law as a violation of due process, however this is being appealed to the Michigan Supreme Court. Meanwhile, there was no clear constitutional protection for abortion access in Michigan, allowing further potential regulation of abortion access.

The amendment was introduced to overturn the 1931 abortion ban and protect the right to "reproductive freedom" in the Michigan Constitution. The Reproductive Freedom For All ballot committee gathered 753,759 signatures for the constitutional amendment, the most ever gathered for a ballot measure in state history, and more than enough for it to be placed on the 2022 ballot. On August 31, the Board of State Canvassers, responsible for determining whether candidates and initiatives should be placed on the ballot, deadlocked 2–2, with challengers arguing that the initiative's wording was poorly-spaced. On September 9, the Michigan Supreme Court ruled 5-2 that the initiative should be placed on the November ballot.

Contents
The proposal appeared on the ballot as follows:
Restrictions on reproductive rights must be implemented in the "least restrictive means", and with a "compelling" interest.

The full text of the section that the proposal added to Article I of the state constitution is as follows:

Sec. 28. (1) Every individual has a fundamental right to reproductive freedom, which entails the right to make and effectuate decisions about all matters relating to pregnancy, including but not limited to prenatal care, childbirth, postpartum care, contraception, sterilization, abortion care, miscarriage management, and infertility care.

An individual’s right to reproductive freedom shall not be denied, burdened, nor infringed upon unless justified by a compelling state interest achieved by the least restrictive means.

Notwithstanding the above, the state may regulate the provision of abortion care after fetal viability, provided that in no circumstance shall the state prohibit an abortion that, in the professional judgment of an attending health care professional, is medically indicated to protect the life or physical or mental health of the pregnant individual.

(2) The state shall not discriminate in the protection or enforcement of this fundamental right.

(3) The state shall not penalize, prosecute, or otherwise take adverse action against an individual based on their actual, potential, perceived, or alleged pregnancy outcomes, including but not limited to miscarriage, stillbirth, or abortion. Nor shall the state penalize, prosecute, or otherwise take adverse action against someone for aiding or assisting a pregnant individual in exercising their right to reproductive freedom with their voluntary consent.

(4) For the purposes of this section:

A state interest is “compelling” only if it is for the limited purpose of protecting the health of an individual seeking care, consistent with accepted clinical standards of practice and evidence-based medicine, and does not infringe on that individual’s autonomous decision-making. “Fetal viability” means: the point in pregnancy when, in the professional judgment of an attending health care professional and based on the particular facts of the case, there is a significant likelihood of the fetus’s sustained survival outside the uterus without the application of extraordinary medical measures.

(5) This section shall be self-executing. Any provision of this section held invalid shall be severable from the remaining portions of this section.

Arguments 
The proposal's main supporters, Reproductive Freedom for All, state that Proposal 3 would "ensure that all Michiganders have the right to safe and respectful care during birthing, everyone has the right to use temporary or permanent birth control, everyone has the right to continue or end a pregnancy pre-viability, and no one can be punished for having a miscarriage, stillbirth, or abortion."

The proposal's main opponents, Citizens to Support MI Women and Children, have called Proposal 3 "extreme", arguing that it could invalidate 41 state laws related to abortion and other issues (including prostitution, statutory rape, and human cloning). They have argued that due to the right to reproductive freedom applying to "all individuals", that it would repeal the requirement for minors to receive parental consent in order to receive an abortion. The group also asserted that the proposal would allow any "attending health care professional" to perform an abortion (a definition under state law that includes athletic trainers and masseuses), and repeal safety standards and inspections of abortion clinics. University of Detroit Mercy associate law professor Michelle Richards argued that such issues could still be regulated under Proposal 3, as a compelling interest to protect the safety and welfare of residents.

It was also argued by opponents that Proposal 3 would allow minors to receive puberty blockers, castration, or a hysterectomy without parental consent, under an interpretation of the proposal that classified these procedures as falling under "infertility" and "sterilization". Washtenaw County Prosecuting Attorney Eli Savit and Michigan University constitutional law professor Leah Litman disputed the claim, citing that Proposal 3 specifically defines the right to "reproductive freedom" as being within the context of pregnancy, with no explicit references to other contexts such as transgender health care.
The Michigan Supreme Court will have to rule on the precise effects of the amendment.

Fundraising
Reproductive Freedom for All has received $44 million, mostly from groups such as the ACLU, Planned Parenthood, and NARAL and Sam Bankman-Fried. Meanwhile, the Citizens to Support MI Women and Children has raised almost $17 million from groups such as the Michigan Catholic Conference and Right to Life of Michigan. Both committees have spent millions of dollars on advertising, including on TV and digital ads.

Polling
Opinion polls over the past few months before the referendum have indicated significant majority support for the amendment. However, its popularity has waned since the backlash from the Dobbs decision first emerged.
Graphical summary

Results
Proposal 3 was approved with 56.66% of the vote. One factor in the proposal's passage was the increased participation in the midterm election by younger voters.

Recount
The America Project, a Donald Trump aligned organization, funded a partial recount of this proposal as well as 2022 Michigan Proposal 2 despite their passage by wide margins.  The recount was spearheaded by Jerome Jay Allen of the conservative group Election Integrity Fund and Force. The recount lasted two weeks and added 116 yes votes and seven no votes to the totals.  This led to calls to tighten recount rules to disallow frivolous recounts with no chance of changing the vote outcome.

See also
 
 
 List of Michigan ballot measures

Notes

References

External links

Michigan Proposal 3
Proposal 3
Abortion referendums
Michigan ballot proposals
United States state abortion legislation
Women in Michigan